Kevin Peraza is an American BMX freestyle competitor. He has represented Mexico and the United States internationally.

His father is an ex-BMX racing rider. His three brothers, Victor, David and Eddie, are also BMX riders.

Career
Peraza won multiple medals at the FISE. In 2013, he won two third place medals at Park and Spine. In 2014, he won a third place medal in Park, and in 2015 he won a second place medal in Park.

He is also a dirt rider. In 2014, he won the Red Bull Dirt Conquers competition. In 2015, he won second place at the Mongoose Jam 2015 Dirt Competition.

Peraza has competed in four X Games, winning gold medals at the X Games Austin 2016 in the BMX Dirt event and X Games Minneapolis 2017 in BMX Park. He secured three top ten finishes in BMX Park and two in BMX Dirt.

He won in 2013 and 2016 in the BMX Park Simple Sessions.

He won third place at the Play BMX Contest in 2013.

In 2017, he won third place at the X-Knights. He won medals at Ultimate X as well: scoring third place in 2016 and 2019.

Later in his career, he turned to BMX street riding. He won several medals in Vans Pro Cup: third place in 2017, fourth place in 2018, and a Best Trick award in 2019.

In 2019, he won multiple leaderboard events in the UCI BMX Supercross World Cup and qualified for the Olympics. For example, he won the C1 in Cary.

References

Living people
1994 births
BMX riders
American sportspeople of Mexican descent